The 1992 Tour de France was the 79th edition of Tour de France, one of cycling's Grand Tours. The Tour began in San Sebastián in Spain with a prologue individual time trial on 4 July and Stage 11 occurred on 15 July with a hilly stage from Strasbourg. The race finished on the Champs-Élysées in Paris on 26 July.

Stage 11
15 July 1992 — Strasbourg to Mulhouse,

Stage 12
16 July 1992 — Dole to Saint Gervais-les-Bains,

Stage 13
18 July 1992 — Saint Gervais-les-Bains to Sestriere,

Stage 14
19 July 1992 — Sestriere to Alpe d'Huez,

Stage 15
20 July 1992 — Le Bourg-d'Oisans to Saint-Étienne,

Stage 16
21 July 1992 — Saint-Étienne to La Bourboule,

Stage 17
22 July 1992 — La Bourboule to Montluçon,

Stage 18
23 July 1992 — Montluçon to Tours,

Stage 19
24 July 1992 — Tours to Blois,  (ITT)

Stage 20
25 July 1992 — Blois to Nanterre,

Stage 21
26 July 1992 — La Défense to Paris Champs-Élysées,

References

1992 Tour de France
Tour de France stages